William Webb (1872 – 29 January 1913) was a New Zealand cricketer. He played seven first-class matches for Otago between 1897 and 1901.

A right-arm bowler, Webb's best bowling figures came on Otago's northern tour in 1899–1900, when he took 5 for 42 in the second innings in the victory over Hawke's Bay. Ill-health led him to retire from cricket in his thirties, when he took up umpiring, but he died at the age of 40. His Dunedin cricket club, Opoho, forfeited its next match so its players could attend his funeral.

See also
 List of Otago representative cricketers

References

External links
 

1872 births
1913 deaths
New Zealand cricketers
Otago cricketers
People from Mosgiel